Pierre Levesy (17 March 1909 – 10 October 1983) was a Monegasque rower. He competed in the men's coxed four event at the 1928 Summer Olympics.

References

External links
 

1909 births
1983 deaths
Monegasque male rowers
Olympic rowers of Monaco
Rowers at the 1928 Summer Olympics
Place of birth missing